Persiculida is an order of sea cucumbers. Taxa within the order Persiculida were previously classified in an order called Aspidochirotida, which was determined to be polyphyletic in 2017.

References 

 
Echinoderm orders